There have been two baronetcies created for persons with the surname Brooks, both in the Baronetage of the United Kingdom: one creation is extant as of 2007.

The Brooks Baronetcy, of Manchester in the County of Lancaster, was created in the Baronetage of the United Kingdom on 4 March 1886 for the banker and Conservative William Cunliffe Brooks. He sat as member of parliament for Cheshire East from 1869 to 1885 and Altrincham from 1886 to 1892 and was also a great benefactor to the town of Sale. His father Samuel Brooks (1792–1864) was a wealthy banker and businessman of Manchester. The title became extinct on the death of Sir William Cunliffe Brooks in 1900.

The Brooks Baronetcy, of Crawshaw Hall and Whatton House, was created in the Baronetage of the United Kingdom on 9 February 1891 for Thomas Brooks for more information on this creation, see Baron Crawshaw.

Brooks baronets, of Manchester (1886)
Sir William Cunliffe Brooks, 1st Baronet (1819–1900)

Brooks baronets, of Crawshaw Hall and Whatton House (1891)
see the Baron Crawshaw

Notes

References
Kidd, Charles & Williamson, David (editors) (1990). Debrett's Peerage and Baronetage (1990 edition). New York: St Martin's Press,

External links
Short biographies of Samuel Brooks and Sir William Cunliffe Brooks, 1st Baronet
Short biography of Sir William Cunliffe Brooks, 1st Baronet

Baronetcies in the Baronetage of the United Kingdom
Extinct baronetcies in the Baronetage of the United Kingdom